Jacob Christopher Lawlor (born 8 April 1991) is an English professional footballer who plays as a defender for  club Darlington.

Lawlor played youth football for Manchester United, but was released at the age of 14, and subsequently played non-league football for Liversedge, Ossett Town and Harrogate Railway Athletic before joining Guiseley in 2013. He had a loan spell at AFC Fylde in 2018, before being released by Guiseley later that year and subsequently joining Salford City in July 2018. However, he joined Wrexham just two months later, having not made an appearance for Salford City. He was released by Wrexham in summer 2020 and joined newly promoted League Two side Harrogate Town. After only one season at Harrogate, Lawlor joined League Two club Hartlepool United.

Career

Early career
Lawlor was born in Halifax and grew up in Brighouse. He played youth football with Manchester United but was released at the age of 14. He played non-league football for Liversedge, joining the club at the age of 17, but left less than a year later to study at Sheffield Hallam University. He joined Ossett Town at the age of 18. After a few years at Ossett Town, he joined Harrogate Railway Athletic in summer 2012.

Guiseley
In February 2013, Lawlor signed for Guiseley of the Conference North. He made his debut for the club against Boston United on 9 February 2013. In summer 2013, he extended his contract with the club for the 2013–14 season. On 23 March 2018, he joined AFC Fylde on loan until the end of the season. He was released by Guiseley at the end of the season.

Salford City and Wrexham
He joined National League club Salford City in July 2018, before moving to fellow National League side Wrexham on a two-year deal for an undisclosed fee in September 2018. He was released by Wrexham at the beginning of July 2020.

Harrogate Town
Lawlor signed for EFL League Two club Harrogate Town in August 2020. He made 17 league appearances across the 2020–21 season, but was released at the end of the season.

Hartlepool United
Lawlor signed for Hartlepool United on 1 August 2021 following a successful trial period, with the length of his contract not disclosed by the club. Lawlor made his Hartlepool debut as a late substitute in a 3–2 defeat to Barrow. Lawlor joined National League club Bromley on a month-long loan on 22 September 2021, but remained an unused substitute through his loan spell.

Darlington
On 12 November, Lawlor joined National League North club Darlington on loan for two months. He was a regular member of the starting eleven, and Darlington's manager, Alun Armstrong, had expected the loan to be extended to the end of the season, but this did not happen. On 19 January 2022, a week after the loan expired, Lawlor's contract with Hartlepool was terminated by mutual consent. The following day, he signed for Darlington for the rest of the season.

Career statistics

References

External links
 

1991 births
Living people
English footballers
Footballers from Halifax, West Yorkshire
Association football defenders
Liversedge F.C. players
Ossett Town F.C. players
Harrogate Railway Athletic F.C. players
Guiseley A.F.C. players
AFC Fylde players
Salford City F.C. players
Wrexham A.F.C. players
Harrogate Town A.F.C. players
Hartlepool United F.C. players
Bromley F.C. players
Darlington F.C. players
National League (English football) players
English Football League players
Alumni of Sheffield Hallam University